Visconte Maggiolo (1478 – after 1549), also spelled Maiollo and Maiolo, was a Genoese cartographer.

He was born in Genoa and maybe he was a fellow sailor of explorer Giovanni da Verrazzano. In 1511 he moved to Naples, where he produced three extant nautical atlases. Some historians say that he died of malaria in 1530; but archival documents show that he was still alive, in Genoa, at least in 1549, although he certainly was already dead in 1561.

In 1527, he created a map depicting Verrazzano's travels. This map had a major error (so-called "Verrazzano Sea" with his "Verrazzano Isthmus", as Giovanni did not accurately describe the North American continent. This error kept on showing up in maps for over a century. A copy of this 1527 map was destroyed during World War II.

There are numerous portolan charts, atlases and at least two other world maps made by Vesconte Maggiolo: one dated Genoa, 1531; another kept at a public library in Treviso (in Italian), is dated Genoa, 1549.

Although he specialized in the mapping of the Mediterranean Sea, the Black Sea and the Aegean Sea, Maggiolo was the first to report in his atlas of 1548 the toponym of the South American river Rio de Amaxones.

Gallery

References
Notes

Bibliography
 Navigazione e carte nautiche nei secoli XIII-XVI, Genova, SAGEP, 1983.
 Corradino Astengo, Der genuesische Kartograph V. M. und sein Werk, in ‘’Cartographica Helvetica’’, 1996, n. 13, pp. 9-17.
 Corradino Astengo, La cartografia nautica mediterranea dei secoli XVI e XVII, Genova 2000, pp. 80-88 e 149-192.
 Corradino Astengo, "The Renaissance Chart Tradition in the Mediterranean", in The History of Cartography, Volume Three (Part 1): Cartography in the European Renaissance, Edited by David Woodward, Chicago, University of Chicago Press, 2007, pp. 174-262.
 Corradino Astengo, "Vesconte Maggiolo (alias Vesconte de Maiolo, Vesconte de Maiollo", in Cartografi in Liguria (secoli XIV-XIX) a cura di Massimo Quaini, Genova, Brigati, 2007, pp. 72–75.

External links

 Map of the World by Viconte di Maiollo, 1527, 1905 facsimile from the Old Maps Collection.
 Portolan Chart, 1516 at The Huntington Library
 Portolan atlas/Vesconte de Maiolo ciuis Janue conposuy, 1511 at the John Carter Brown Library.

1478 births
Scientists from Genoa
16th-century Italian cartographers
16th-century Genoese people